String Quartet No. 3 by Béla Bartók was written in September 1927 in Budapest. It is one of six string quartets by Bartók.

The work is in one continuous stretch with no breaks, but is divided in the score into four parts:

Despite Bartók calling the third section a "recapitulation" it is not a straight repetition of the music from the prima parte, being somewhat varied and simplified. Although not marked as such, the coda is in fact a telescoped recapitulation of the seconda parte.

The mood of the first part is quite bleak, contrasting with the second part which is livelier and provides evidence of the inspiration Bartók drew from Hungarian folk music, with dance-like melodies to the fore.

The work is even more harmonically adventurous and contrapuntally complex than Bartók's previous two string quartets and explores a number of extended instrumental techniques, including sul ponticello (playing with the bow as close as possible to the bridge), col legno (playing with the wood rather than the hair of the bow), and glissandi (sliding from one note to another).

It has often been suggested that Bartók was inspired to write the piece after hearing a performance of Alban Berg's Lyric Suite (1926) in 1927. The piece is the most tightly constructed of Bartók's six string quartets, the whole deriving from a relatively small amount of thematic material integrated into a single continuous structure. It is also Bartók's shortest quartet, with a typical performance lasting around fifteen minutes.

The work is dedicated to the Musical Society Fund of Philadelphia and was entered into an international competition for chamber music run by the organization. It won the US$6,000 first prize jointly with a work by Alfredo Casella. The piece was premiered on 19 February 1929 by the Waldbauer-Kerpely Quartet in London's Wigmore Hall.

The piece was first published in 1929 by Universal Edition.

Discography

References

External links
 
 Béla Bartók - String Quartet No. 3 on YouTube

1926 compositions
Compositions that use extended techniques
3